The Church of Our Lady of Sorrows, or the Church of Sorrows of Mary also called the Armenian Chapel of Our Lady of the Spasm, is an Armenian Catholic church building in the Old City of Jerusalem erected in 1881.

Located at the fourth station on the Via Dolorosa, under the Arc Ecce Homo, not far from the Austrian Hospice in the Muslim Quarter of the Old City of Jerusalem, it commemorates Jesus' encounter on the way to his crucifixion with his mother. The building includes a chapel dedicated to the Virgin Mary, and is thus named in dedicated to her under the title Our Lady of Sorrows.

As the seat of the Armenian Catholic Patriarchal Exarchate of Jerusalem and Amman of the Armenian Catholic Church, an Eastern Catholic particular church sui iuris in full communion with the Pope in Rome, and the Catholic Church, the church building holds the status of cathedral. The facility is also the Armenian hospice in Jerusalem.

It is a World Heritage Site of UNESCO since 1981.

See also

Catholic Church in Palestine

References

Armenian Catholic cathedrals
Armenians in Jerusalem
Cathedrals in Jerusalem
Eastern Catholic church buildings in Jerusalem
Eastern Catholic cathedrals in Israel
Eastern Catholic cathedrals in the State of Palestine
Armenian Catholic church buildings in Israel
Armenian Catholic church buildings in the State of Palestine